Abdul Latif Baloch, better known by his screen name Saqi (2 April 1925 – 22 December 1986), was a Pakistani film and television actor. He is known for mostly playing supportive roles in the Lollywood movies. He starred in more than 500 Urdu, Punjabi, Sindhi, and Pashto films.

Early life and family
Saqi was born on April 2, 1925, in Baghdad, Iraq, where his father had been appointed during the first world war and later stayed there for a while as a railway employee. Saqi belonged to a Baloch family settled in Dadu District, Sindh. His mother was a Kurd from Iraq. His step-brother Abdul Karim Baloch served as a general manager at PTV, Karachi Center.

Career
Saqi could speak more than 10 languages and his ability to speak English fluently helped him gain a small role in an international film Bhowani Junction (1956) which was partly shot in Lahore. His first Urdu film Ilteja was released in 1955. He appeared in a leading role along with Nighat Sultana in the movie Lakhpati (1958). In 1959, he played a role of a snake charmer in the film Nagin. Another important film in his career was the 1967 release Lakhon Mein Aik. He was mostly cast in character and villain roles.

Saqi worked in over 500 Urdu, Punjabi, Sindhi, and Pashto films. He also produced two films, Paapi (1968) and Hum Log (1970), but they couldn't get box office success. He also played significant roles in TV plays like Deewarein, Jungle, and Gardish. He introduced two male playback singers Mujeeb Aalam and Masood Rana to Lollywood films. His last film Dushmani was released in 1990, four years after his death.

Personal life and death
From his first marriage, Saqi had two girls and four sons. Later, he also married the actress Yasmeen Khan who used to work in Pashto films. Saqi died on 22 December 1986.

Selected filmography
 Iltija (1955)
 Raaz (1957)
 Lakhpati (1958)
 Sassi Punnu (1958)
 Nagin (1959)
 Raat Kay Rahi (1960)
 Izzat (1960)
 Bombay Wala (1961)
 Shaheed (1962)
 Hazar Dastan (1965)
 Aag Ka Darya (1966)
 Lakhon Mein Aik (1967)
 Mera Ghar Meri Jannat (1968)
 Zarqa (1969)
 Afsana (1970)
 Naseeb Apna Apna (1970)
 Permit (1979)

References

1925 births
1986 deaths
Pakistani film actors
Baloch people
People from Dadu District
Pakistani male film actors
Pakistani television actors